Jean-Michel Fauvergue (born 31 January 1957) is a French police commander and politician of La République En Marche! (LREM) who served as a member of the National Assembly from 2017 to 2022, representing the department of Seine-et-Marne.

Early career
Before entering politics, Fauvergue was the commander of the RAID special police forces unit which carried out the raid in the suburb of Saint Denis during the November 2015 Paris attacks.

Political career
As a parliamentarian, Fauvergue served on the Committee on Legal Affairs. Together with Alice Thourot, he co-authored a 2018 report with more than 70 recommendations on how to support security forces and the Municipal Police in France. In 2020, he served as co-capporteur (alongside Thourot) on a law proposed by Minister of the Interior Gérald Darmanin to criminalize the dissemination of images showing law enforcement officers with the intention of causing harm to them.

Political positions
In July 2019, Fauvergue voted in favor of the French ratification of the European Union’s Comprehensive Economic and Trade Agreement (CETA) with Canada.

See also
 2017 French legislative election

References

1957 births
Living people
Deputies of the 15th National Assembly of the French Fifth Republic
La République En Marche! politicians
People from Pyrénées-Orientales
French police chiefs